Anastasia Nikolaevna Metelkina (born 10 March 2005) is a Russian-born pair skater who competes for Georgia. With her skating partner, Daniil Parkman, she is the 2022 Grand Prix of Espoo bronze medalist and 2021 CS Golden Spin of Zagreb silver medalist.

Metelkina/Parkman are the first Georgian pairs team to compete at a World Championships, doing so in 2021. In January 2023, the couple broke up and will not perform at the European Championship in Finnish Espoo.

Programs

With Parkman

Competitive highlights

With Parkman

Detailed results 
ISU Personal Best highlighted in bold.

With Parkman

References

External links 
 
 

2005 births
Living people
Russian female pair skaters
Female pair skaters from Georgia (country)
People from Vladimir, Russia
Sportspeople from Vladimir Oblast